Chalcides mauritanicus, or the two-fingered skink, is an African species of skink found in Algeria and Morocco. It occurs in sandy areas and plantations, but cannot exist in severely modified habitats. It also requires good ground cover, but as this is becoming increasingly scarce, the species is declining. The distribution of the species is severely fragmented. Females of the species give birth to live young.

References

 Database entry includes a range map and justification for why this species is endangered
Pasteur, G. 1981. A survey of the species groups of the old world scincid genus Chalcides. Journal of Herpetology 15(1): 1–16

External links

Chalcides
Reptiles of North Africa
Reptiles described in 1839
Taxa named by André Marie Constant Duméril
Taxa named by Gabriel Bibron